This is a list of incumbent presidents of the autonomous communities of Spain. The presidents head the regional government of the autonomous communities and are elected by the regional legislatures.

Presidents

Currently, the longest serving incumbent Spanish regional president is Juan Jesús Vivas of Ceuta, having served since February 2001, and the most recently inaugurated is Alfonso Rueda of Galicia, having served since May 2022. In terms of age, Cantabria president Miguel Ángel Revilla (born 1943) is the oldest president, and Murcia president Fernando López Miras (born 1983) is the youngest.

 (9): Aragon, Asturias, Balearic Islands, Canary Islands, Castilla-La Mancha, Extremadura, La Rioja, Navarre, Valencian Community

 (6): Andalusia, Castile and León, Ceuta, Galicia, Community of Madrid, Murcia

 (1): Melilla

 (1): Cantabria

 (1): Basque Country

 (1): Catalonia

Timeline of current presidents

See also

 List of female regional presidents in Spain
 Presidents of the autonomous communities

References

Spain, president of autonomous communities